Anil Aggrawal is a professor of forensic medicine at the Maulana Azad Medical College, New Delhi, India. He is known chiefly for his online journal, Anil Aggrawal's Internet Journal of Forensic Medicine and Toxicology. He joined Maulana Azad Medical College as a faculty member in 1985. Dr. Aggrawal proposed a new classification of necrophilia, and is considered the leading authority on necrophilia.

References

External links
 Official Website
 Google Scholar 
 Research Gate
 CV

Living people
Indian forensic scientists
Forensic pathologists
Medical journal editors
Indian medical writers
Medical doctors from Delhi
20th-century Indian medical doctors
Year of birth missing (living people)